The UK Singles Chart is a weekly record chart which for most of its history was based on single sales from Sunday to Saturday in the United Kingdom. From 2004, downloads became included in the chart for the first time, and rules were altered in 2006 so that singles could chart before a physical copy was released. Since July 2014 it has also incorporated streaming data, with music videos also counted towards the chart from July 2018. From 10 July 2015 the chart has been based on a Friday to Thursday week. The chart was founded in 1952 by Percy Dickins of New Musical Express (NME), who telephoned 20 record stores to ask what their top 10 highest-selling singles were. Dickins aggregated the results into a top 12 hit parade, which was topped by "Here in My Heart" by Al Martino. NMEs chart was published each week in its eponymous magazine.

The sources, in accordance with the official canon of the Official Charts Company, are the New Musical Express chart from 1952 to 1960; the Record Retailer chart from 1960 to 1969; and the Official UK Singles Chart from 1969 onwards.

This list shows the artists who have had the most top 10 singles on the UK Singles Chart. Elvis Presley holds the record for most top 10 singles with 76, having first entered the chart in 1956 with his number two hit "Heartbreak Hotel". His last entry was the posthumous song "Way Down" in 2005 which reached the same position after being re-released along with many of Presley's other hits to mark what would have been his 70th birthday. Cliff Richard is in second place, his 68 hit singles including his work with The Shadows. He was last seen in 2008 with "Thank You for a Lifetime", having made his chart debut with "Move It" in 1958. Madonna has the third most entries of all time in the top 10, her 63 hits spanning 25 years from "Holiday" in 1984 through to "Celebration" in 2009. She made history and gained a spot in the Guinness World Records in 1998 that still remains for most consecutive top 10 singles, with 36 between 1984 and 1994.

Among the other acts on this list, Ariana Grande, Avicii, Calvin Harris, Chris Brown, Ed Sheeran, Justin Bieber, Little Mix, P!nk, Sam Smith, Taylor Swift and Whitney Houston all added to their totals in 2019. Sheeran holds a chart record for the most concurrent singles in the top ten, set in 2017 when tracks from his third album, ÷, occupied nine of the ten spots, as well as 16 of the top twenty.

Avicii is the most recent artist to celebrate ten singles making the top 10 on the UK Singles Chart, his posthumous release "SOS" - with vocals from Aloe Blacc - reaching its peak position of number six in May 2019 and spending ten weeks in the top ten.

Most top-ten singles

Note that in cases where an artist or group has reached the top 10 with the same release more than once, it is counted as a solitary entry by the Official Charts Company. Thus, for example, the 1984 release of "Last Christmas" by Wham! had reached the top 10 twice (both in 1984 and 1985), whilst the 2007 release had done so on 5 occasions (in each of the years between 2016 and 2020 inclusive). This was counted as two (rather than 7) top 10 entries.

This list was last updated on 18 March 2023.

Notes
 Paul McCartney's total includes singles as part of The Beatles, Wings and on the charity singles  "Ferry Cross the Mersey" and "He Ain't Heavy, He's My Brother".
 Cheryl has scored 8 solo top 10 entries (36 weeks in the top 10) and a further 21 hits with Girls Aloud (61 weeks).
 Seven of Michael Jackson's 50 top 10 hits were as a member of family group the Jackson 5, spending 24 weeks total in the top 10.
 Beyoncé launched her solo career in 2002 after a series of hits as part of Destiny's Child. She had 13 top 10 singles in total with the group between 1998 and 2015.
 One Direction members Louis Tomlinson, Niall Horan and Harry Styles have all had one top 10 single in their own right on top of their 17 hits with the band. Zayn has recorded two top 10s, including the number-one "Pillowtalk". All of the members figures include charity singles with The X Factor 2010 and 2011 finalists and Band Aid 30.

References

External links
Official UK Singles Top 100 at the Official Charts Company
The Official UK Top 40 Albums Chart at BBC Radio 1
Every artist to have a UK number 1 from 1960 - today with links to websites and videos

British record charts
Lists of artists by record chart achievement